Big Darby Creek is a scenic river located in northwestern central Ohio, and an important tributary to the Lower Scioto River. The river's major tributary is the Little Darby Creek.

The river runs  from its source near the Champaign-Union county line, south-east through Union and Madison Counties. In Franklin County, the river runs through the  Battelle Darby Creek Metro Park, where it meets with the Little Darby Creek.

Big Darby Creek is one of the most biologically diverse aquatic systems in the Midwestern United States. It is the site of the only known population of the Scioto madtom, a fish which is now thought to be extinct. In addition, for its size the creek "has the greatest diversity of freshwater mussels in North America. Forty species have been reported from the system."  During creek bird surveys from 1989-1991, Zoologist Dan Rice identified 86 species of riparian corridor bird species adjacent to Big Darby Creek Scenic River. Between 1984 and 1992 Rice conducted fish surveys and found 72 species of fish in Big Darby Creek.

History
When The Columbus Dispatch published an article in 1967 revealing the City of Columbus' plans to purchase over  along the river to build a reservoir, a political and legal battle ensued between the municipality and several environmental groups working with the Ohio Department of Natural Resources. From 1974 to 1984, both sides exchanged victories and the legal battle continued into the Ohio Supreme Court, who ended the battle by ruling that the 'scenic river' designation was constitutional. On June 22, 1984, the Upper and Lower Darby Creeks were designated a state scenic river, and then added to the National Wild and Scenic Rivers System on March 10, 1994.  In 2003, Big Darby and Little Darby Creeks were also given their own Historical Markers.

In 2008, the Columbus Zoo and Aquarium built a new exhibit focusing on the Big Darby Creek and its more than 38 rare species of fish and mussels, and in 2009, the City of Columbus, Franklin County Metro Parks, the Ohio Nature Conservancy and other companies spent more than $6 million on seven projects designed to restore sections of the river and its tributaries.

Gallery

See also
List of National Wild and Scenic Rivers
List of rivers of Ohio

References

Rivers of Union County, Ohio
Rivers of Madison County, Ohio
Rivers of Franklin County, Ohio
Rivers of Pickaway County, Ohio
Rivers of Ohio
Wild and Scenic Rivers of the United States